The Laksamana class is a class of small missile corvettes comprising four ships currently in service with the Royal Malaysian Navy.  All four ships of the Laksamana class are currently serving in the 24th Corvette Squadron of the Royal Malaysian Navy.

Development
The Laksamana-class corvettes were originally purchased by the Iraqi Navy as the s, their delivery was delayed and later cancelled because of international sanctions against Iraq following the invasion of Kuwait by Iraq.  It is based on the Fincantieri Type 550 corvette design.

In October 1995, the Malaysian Ministry of Finance signed a contract with Italian company Fincantieri for the supply of two 675-ton missile corvettes for the Royal Malaysian Navy.  Two more missile corvettes were ordered in February 1997.  Some specific aspects of the ships' design were modified and the ships were refitted to meet the requirements of the Royal Malaysian Navy.

The first two ships, named KD Laksamana Hang Nadim and KD Laksamana Tun Abdul Jamil, were commissioned in July 1997. The second two, named KD Laksamana Muhammad Amin and KD Laksamana Tan Pusmah, were delivered in July 1999.

The ships are all named after famous Malay warriors who have earned the title Laksamana during their lifetimes. ("Laksamana" would translate as an admiral in modern usage, but in the Malay Sultanates, the title would be more a minister of the realm (a warrior) who is responsible for defense of the realm. The Laksamana is the second most senior position the Malay court, lower only than the Bendahara).

Characteristics

Sensors
The ship's radar suite consists of a RAN 12L/X air and surface search radar, operating in D and I bands and a Kelvin Hughes 1007 navigation radar operating at I band. The ship is also fitted with a Global Positioning System (GPS).

The ship's electronic warfare suite comprises the INS-3 radar interceptor and the TQN-2 radar jammer.

Underwater sensors provided is the ASO 94-41 hull mounted active search and attack sonar supplied by Atlas Elektronik.

Armament
The Laksamana class is armed with the MBDA Otomat Mark 2/Teseo long-range sea-skimming missile with six missile launchers installed on the stern deck, three pointing to port and three pointing starboard.

A medium-range air defence is provided with the semi-active radar homing MBDA Albatros SAM system, providing defence against aircraft and incoming anti-ship missiles. The Albatros system fires the Mach 2.5 Aspide missile over a  range to deliver a  warhead.

The class is armed with a  62 calibre Oto Melara Super Rapid gun is installed on the bow deck in front of the citadel.

A  decoy launcher is installed on both the port and starboard side of the ship. Each launcher has six launch tubes and is capable of firing illuminating rounds or chaff rounds to counter hostile radars and radar guided missiles.

Propulsion system
The ships are powered by four MTU 20V 956 TB 92 diesel engines developing  sustained power driving four shafts. Three diesel generators each yield 280 KVA.

Upgrade and refurbished
The Royal Malaysian Navy has confirmed that all four ships will be upgrade or refurbished to extend their service. The upgrade includes missile launchers, sensors, combat management system, fire control radar, IFF and chaff. As of 2022, the upgraded and refurbished program done for the first ship KD Laksamana Muhammad Amin. The upgrade however doesn't includes the installation of new weapons to replace the obsoleted missiles and torpedoes.

Similar class 
The four s  built for Libya are a similar design to the Laksamana class.

Ships of the class

References 

Corvette classes
 
 
Ships built by Fincantieri